Fairymount GAA is a former Gaelic football club near Newtown in County Laois, Ireland.

The club was located near the Laois-Kilkenny border in the catchment area of the current Crettyard club.

Fairymount won the Laois Junior Football Championship in 1952 and also reached the final of the Laois Minor Football Championship in 1957 where they were beaten by Annanough.

In 1959, Fairymount reached the final of the Laois Intermediate Football Championship only to be beaten by Stradbally, 1-6 to 0-5.

References

Former Gaelic Athletic Association clubs in County Laois